My Life as a Dog is a contemporary, half-hour Canadian drama series that ran for 22 episodes from September 8, 1996 until February 2, 1997. It was based on the 1985 Swedish movie of the same name and was developed for Canadian television by, among others, Reidar Jönsson, author of the original autobiographical book.

It is the coming of age story of a young boy, brutally dragged away from his familiar universe into an unknown world. Though aimed at teens, it has been rated above the usual "infantile sitcoms".

The series was shot on location in Winnipeg and Gimli, Manitoba. It was directed by Neill Fearnley and produced by Atlantis Films Limited and Credo Entertainment Group.

Plot
After his mother's death and with his sailor father away at sea, imaginative 11-year-old Eric Johansson is sent to live in a small fishing village with his mother's twin brother, Johnny Johansson. Eric's adventures in Gimli will help him to feel at home with his new family and come to terms with some pre-adolescent uncertainties while Johnny, burdened with unexpected fatherly duties, has to make some choices he avoided to face before.

Cast
Michael Yarmush - Eric Johansson
Callum Keith Rennie - Johnny Johansson
Marley Otto - Anastasia 'AJ' Burke
Jennifer Clement - Zoë Johansson
Joy Coghill - Astrid 'Auntie Auntie' Árnesson
Bucky Hill - Sam LaFresne
Yank Azman - Tom Shaughnessy

Awards
In 1997 Callum Keith Rennie won a Gemini Award for Best Performance in a Children's or Youth Program or Series for his role as Johnny Johansson. Michael Yarmush won the 1998 Young Artist Award for Best Performance in a TV Drama Series - Leading Young Actor and was nominated for a YoungStar Award for Best Performance by a Young Actor in a Drama TV Series the same year.

Episodes

References

External links 

1990s Canadian children's television series
1990s Canadian comedy-drama television series
1996 Canadian television series debuts
1997 Canadian television series endings
Canadian children's comedy television series
Canadian children's drama television series
Television series about brothers
Television series about orphans
Television series about twins
Television series by CBS Studios
Television shows filmed in Winnipeg